Mâcon Cathedral is a Roman Catholic church located in Mâcon, Burgundy, France. The cathedral is in the neoclassical architectural style typical for its time.

It was formerly the seat of the Bishop of Mâcon, abolished under the Concordat of 1801 and merged into the Diocese of Autun.

The present church (Église cathédrale Saint-Vincent de Mâcon) was built between 1808 and 1818 under the supervision of the architect Alexandre de Gisors. Of its predecessor, known as "Vieux Saint-Vincent" (Old St. Vincent), there remain two towers, a narthex and a tympanum. The highly distinctive south tower, which is topped by a belvedere, serves as a symbol of Mâcon.

External links
 Ancient Diocese of Mâcon
  Vieux St. Vincent, with photo

Former cathedrals in France
Churches in Saône-et-Loire